"Ride, Ride, Ride" is a song written by Liz Anderson that was first recorded by American country music artist Lynn Anderson. It was released as a single in October 1966 via Chart Records. It was later recorded by American pop artist Brenda Lee shortly afterward and became a top 40 single for her.

Lynn Anderson version
"Ride, Ride, Ride" was recorded at the RCA Victor Studio in July 1966, located in Nashville, Tennessee. The sessions was produced by Slim Williamson, Anderson's producer while recording for the Chart label. It was Anderson's third official recording session in her music career. Also recorded at the same studio session was three additional tracks, including her first major hit "If I Kiss You (Will You Go Away)."

"Ride, Ride, Ride" was released as a single in October 1966. The song spent 17 weeks on the Billboard Hot Country Singles chart before reaching number 36 in January 1967. "Ride, Ride, Ride" was Anderson's first single to chart on any Billboard survey. It was also her first top 40 entry on the country songs chart. Her follow-up solo release, "If I Kiss You (Will You Go Away)," would become her first top ten hit. The song was issued on Anderson's 1969 studio album, With Love, from Lynn.

Track listing 
7" vinyl single
 "Ride, Ride, Ride" – 2:00
 "Tear by Tear" – 2:05

Chart performance

Brenda Lee version

"Ride, Ride, Ride" was notably recorded by Brenda Lee shortly following the release of Anderson's version to country radio. Lee's version was cut at Bradley's Barn, located in Mount Juliet, Tennessee on December 15, 1966. The sessions was produced by Owen Bradley, who was Lee's longtime producer at her record company. Three additional tracks were cut at the same recording session.

Lee's version of "Ride, Ride, Ride" was released as a single in January 1967. The song spent 17 weeks on the Billboard Hot 100 singles chart before reaching number 37 in February 1967. Although Lee's version was a top 40 success, the song was not issued on an album.

Track listing 
7" vinyl single
 "Ride, Ride, Ride" – 1:58
 "Lonely People Do Foolish Things" – 3:01

Chart performance

References

1966 songs
1966 singles
1967 singles
Lynn Anderson songs
Brenda Lee songs
Songs written by Liz Anderson
Decca Records singles